Chorizocormus is a genus of ascidian tunicates in the family Styelidae.

Species within the genus Chorizocormus include:
 Chorizocormus reticulatus Herdman, 1886

Species names currently considered to be synonyms:
 Chorizocormus leucophaeus Herdman, 1891: synonym of Chorizocarpa sydneyensis (Herdman, 1891) 
 Chorizocormus reticulata : synonym of Chorizocormus reticulatus Herdman, 1886 
 Chorizocormus subfuscus Herdman, 1891: synonym of Chorizocarpa sydneyensis (Herdman, 1891) 
 Chorizocormus sydneyensis Herdman, 1891: synonym of Chorizocarpa sydneyensis (Herdman, 1891)

References

Stolidobranchia
Tunicate genera
Taxa named by William Abbott Herdman